Cebia rugosa is a species of cylindrical bark beetle native to India and Sri Lanka.

Description
The body is smaller and flat with average size of 2.5 to 2.9 mm. Setae on eyes are short and white in color. Antennae are ferruginous.

References 

Zopheridae
Insects of Sri Lanka
Insects of India
Insects described in 1863